NRANK, or National Rank, is a ranking of the rarity of a species within a nation.  Each nation can assign their own NRANK based on information from conservation data centres, natural heritage programmes, and expert scientists.

Taxonomy (biology)